Michael Byrne (born 2 December 1958), nicknamed Mick The Kick, is a former Australian rules footballer and rugby union coach, whom specialises in kicking and team skills. Byrne played with Melbourne, Hawthorn and Sydney in the Victorian Football League (VFL) from 1977 to 1989. He also coached his junior side in 1994–95. Currently Byrne is the head coach of Super Rugby Pacific team Fijian Drua ahead of there 2022 season.

Football career

Victorian Football League
A 200 cm tall ruckman, Byrne started his career at Melbourne in 1977 and one game into his sixth season with the club decided to cross to Hawthorn. Byrne kicked 8 goals straight in his debut game for the Hawks against Footscray in 1982. He finished the year with 47 goals. In 1983, Byrne finished equal fifth in the Brownlow Medal and was a member of Hawthorn's premiership side, kicking three goals in the Grand Final. 

He holds the Hawthorn record for the most behinds in a VFL/AFL game without a goal, after kicking 0.8 in a game against Melbourne in 1985. In the history of the league, only Stuart Spencer and Tom Allen are known to have kicked more behinds without a goal (11).

Byrne moved to Sydney in 1987, playing 21 games for the Swans before his retirement at the end of the 1989 VFL season. In all Byrne played 167 league games and kicked 150 goals.

Rugby union coaching  
Following his retirement, Byrne became involved in coaching, with his long kicking ability proving an advantage as he became a skills coach in rugby union. He worked as a coach in England and Scotland in the early 2000s. Byrne was appointed skills coach of the Leinster Rugby Club alongside Australian coach Matt Williams in the 2002–03 season. In 2003, Byrne, as well as Williams, left Leinster for Scotland for the same roles.

New Zealand, Australia
In the role from 2003–05, Byrne left Scotland following an appointment by New Zealand as a skills and kicking coach in May 2005, which saw him in the role for over a decade. During his tenure as specialty coach of New Zealand, Byrne won two rugby world cups (2011, 2015), eight Tri Nations / Rugby Championship trophies (2005, 2006, 2007, 2008, 2010, 2012, 2013, 2014) and a British and Irish Lions tour (2005). Before leaving New Zealand, Byrne was quite involved with Auckland-based Super Rugby team the Blues whilst simultaneously remaining inside the All Blacks coaching team. When Byrne left New Zealand in December 2015, the team had accrued a win percentage above eighty-seven percent and is often praised as having deep involvement in building the "All Blacks Empire".

Several months after leaving New Zealand with a desire to be closer to his family in Brisbane, Queensland, Byrne was hired as a skills coach for the Wallabies (July 2016) on a four-year contract, working alongside coach Michael Cheika. Unfortunately, during his four years with the Wallabies, the team failed to win a single major trophy. However, did win the Mandela Challenge Plate (2016, 2017, 2018), the Puma Trophy (2016, 2017, 2018, 2019), the James Bevan Trophy (2016, 2017), the Hopetoun Cup (2016) and the Trophée des Bicentenaires (2016). Byrne was with the Wallabies from July 2016 to March 2020.

Fijian Drua
On 24 September 2021, Byrne was announced as the head coach of the Fijian Drua ahead there first season in the Super Rugby (2022). It is the first role Byrne has had as a head coach of a major professional team.

References
Notes

Citations

External links

Demonwiki profile
Hawksheadquarters profile

1958 births
Living people
Melbourne Football Club players
Hawthorn Football Club players
Hawthorn Football Club Premiership players
North Shore Australian Football Club players
Sydney Swans players
Australian rules footballers from New South Wales
New South Wales Australian rules football State of Origin players
One-time VFL/AFL Premiership players
Australian rugby union coaches